Lindsay Williams (born June 16, 1984) is an American cross-country skier. She competed in two events at the 2006 Winter Olympics.

Cross-country skiing results
All results are sourced from the International Ski Federation (FIS).

Olympic Games

World Cup

Season standings

References

External links
 

1984 births
Living people
American female cross-country skiers
Olympic cross-country skiers of the United States
Cross-country skiers at the 2006 Winter Olympics
Sportspeople from Saint Paul, Minnesota
21st-century American women